Enrique Torres (July 25, 1922 – September 10, 2007) was an American professional wrestler, the oldest three Torres brothers in wrestling, and a major star in the late 1940s and 1950s.

Personal life
Torres was married to Maria in 1938. They had one daughter, Helen, born in December 1939. They also had a son, Enrique (Tony), born in November 1940. Later Torres married Rachel in 1950. They had two sons; Allan Enrique, born April 1952, and Jim (James), born June 1956. Enrique married Kata in 1963; Kata and he later moved to Canada ultimately to reside in Calgary, Alberta, Canada, they had forty-four wonderful years together. In his later years Enrique was on kidney dialysis in addition to receiving a kidney transplant in 2006, then suffered a stroke. On September 10, 2007 he died as a resident of the Carewest George Boyack Nursing Home in Calgary.

Professional wrestling career
Torres was born in Santa Ana, California and after a long amateur career entered professional wrestling in 1946 debuting at the Olympic Auditorium and was very successful in the nascent and booming televised wrestling market in the California. He had no gimmicks, however his signature move was a deftly executed Flying Scissors. He used no self given stage name but a Mexican-market newspaper billed him as “La Pantera Negro de Sonora”, or "The Black Panther from Sonora, Mexico,"  due to his "smooth and lightning-fast moves." He was later named "The Mexican Adonis." In his first year, he won the California version of the world heavyweight championship before losing it Gorgeous George, only to win it back the following year.

In 1952 Torres and then-rival Baron Leone were involved in a case that went all the way to the Santa Monica Superior Court due to two fans claiming they were injured when Leone threw Torres into the crowd. Leone claimed if he was capable of the feat he'd leave wrestling to play for the Southern Cal football team, and the two were exonerated. One of Torres' greatest matches was in February 1953 while he was the reigning Pacific Coast Heavy Weight champion, he wrestled the legendary world heavyweight champion Lou Thesz to a one-hour draw. The gate was a then-record $5000 in Sacramento.  He also claimed the Central States championship in 1952 and 1963.

Due to his success Torres' brothers Alberto and Ramon wanted to join him in wrestling. Enrique worked with Alberto and Ramon; Rachel, Enrique’s second wife, worked to help train Ramon in the various wrestling holds and tactics. In time, with hard work and training in Oakland, CA they received Enrique's blessing and later went on the road. The three went on to be involved in a 'Vachon-Torres Brother War' in Georgia against the Vachon wrestling family. In 1971 Alberto was the first to die, as a result of a ruptured pancreas from a match in the ring. Ramon died in August 2000 of heart failure.

In addition to his singles titles, Torres also held numerous tag team championships teamed with Bobo Brazil, Leo Nomellini, Ronnie Etchison, Johnny Barend, Jess Ortega, and his brothers in the 1950s and 1960s, ranging from Texas to the Central States territory.

Enrique and Alberto wrestled a headliner match in Havana, Cuba the night that the Batista regime fell to Castro’s rebel army in 1959 and returned to the US with the help of his Promoter, Benny Ginsberg and his Meyer Lansky connections in Cuba.

Enrique retired in 1968 after one last run as a headline star, living in California Hawaii and Nevada.  In 1969 Enrique was asked to make a cameo appearance by Jimmy Lennon, a much loved sports announcer at the Olympic Auditorium in Los Angeles for a celebration of twenty-five years of televised wrestling.

Enrique later moved with his third wife Kata Calgary, Alberta, Canada. In 2006, a Japanese reporter visited Calgary, Canada to meet and interview Enrique one last time.  Enrique remains highly respected and revered as part of the Japan Wrestling Association where he wrestled the Japanese Sumobasho circuit in the 1960s. His success came for his skills, talent, good looks and a convergence of technology and the need for television content in what later became a multi-billion-dollar market.  Those were the days of real wrestling.  He used to say, "that these cauliflower ears didn't come from sleeping on hard hotel pillows, as well as his knee, back and other injuries sustained in the arena ring.  It was called the arena, as a left over from the days of gladiatorial combat, arena means "the sand" in Latin.

Enrique Torres - in 2010, voted into the Wrestling-Hall-of-Fame by a special committee that looked at pre-1980 wrestlers, Enrique Torres was one of the biggest stars in Southern California in the 1940s and 1950s. Enrique held the Los Angeles version of the World Title almost nonstop between 1946 and 1950. During that time he had two of the biggest feuds of the era with Gorgeos George and later Baron Michele Leone. He retired from wrestling in 1968 and died in 2007 at the age of 85.

Championships and accomplishments
50th State Big Time Wrestling
NWA United States Heavyweight Championship (Hawaii version) (1 time)
NWA Hawaii Tag Team Championship (1 time) - with Alberto Torres
 California State Athletic Commission
 World Heavyweight Championship (Los Angeles version) (2 times)
Central States Wrestling
NWA Central States Heavyweight Championship (2 times)
NWA United States Heavyweight Championship (Central States version) (1 time)
Georgia Championship Wrestling
NWA Georgia Southern Tag Team Championship (10 times) - with Alberto Torres (6) and Ramon Torres (4)
NWA World Tag Team Championship (Georgia version) (5 times) - with Alberto Torres (2) and Ramon Torres (3)
Mid-Atlantic Championship Wrestling
NWA Southern Tag Team Championship (Mid-Atlantic version) (1 time) - with George Becker
NWA All-Star Wrestling
NWA Canadian Tag Team Championship (Vancouver version) (1 time) - with Bearcat Wright
NWA Hollywood Wrestling
NWA American Heavyweight Championship (Los Angeles version) (1 time)
NWA San Francisco
NWA Pacific Coast Heavyweight Championship (San Francisco version) (4 times)
NWA Pacific Coast Tag Team Championship (San Francisco version) (6 times) - with Gino Garibaldi (1), Leo Nomellini (1), Ramon Torres (1), Ron Etchinson (2), and Sandor Kovacs (1)
NWA World Tag Team Championship (San Francisco version) (8 times) - with Leo Nomellini (2), Johnny Barend (1), Bobo Brazil (2), Ronnie Etchison (1), Rip Miller, (1), and Reggie Parks (1)
Southern California Pro-Wrestling Hall of Fame
Class of 2010
NWA Southwest Sports, Inc.
NWA Texas Tag Team Championship (1 time) - with Alberto Torres

References

External links

1922 births
2007 deaths
American male professional wrestlers
American professional wrestlers of Mexican descent
Mexican male professional wrestlers
Kidney transplant recipients
People from Santa Ana, California
Professional wrestlers from California